TF algorithm may refer to:
 Teknomo–Fernandez algorithm, an algorithm for generating the background image of a given video sequence
 TensorFlow, an open-source software library for machine learning